Cyclophora tharossa is a moth in the family Geometridae first described by Herbert Druce in 1899. It is found in Panama.

References

Moths described in 1899
Cyclophora (moth)
Moths of Central America